Robert H. Edelstein is an American economist, currently the Professor Emeritus, Maurice Mann Chair in Real Estate at Haas School of Business, University of California at Berkeley.  He graduated from Harvard University.

References

Year of birth missing (living people)
Living people
Haas School of Business faculty
American economists
Harvard University alumni